Another Round is a culture podcast co-hosted by Tracy Clayton and Heben Nigatu. Debuting on BuzzFeed on March 24, 2015, Another Round featured interviews with guests such as writer and MacArthur Genius Ta-Nehisi Coates and U.S. Presidential candidate Hillary Clinton, as well as segments on topics ranging from race, gender to pop culture. The podcast has been on hiatus since late 2017 when BuzzFeed ceased production.

About 
The premise of the podcast was that the two hosts, Clayton and Nigatu, talk to each other and guests while both having fun and tackling serious topics, like mental health, feminism and racism. In their debut episode, they described the podcast: "Another Round is basically happy hour with friends you haven't met yet. Grab a drink and yell along." The hosts always had drinks throughout the taping and it was a central theme of the show, helping give it a casual vibe. At the same time, the show had multiple prepared segments, topics, and interviews with many notable guests. It mixed corny jokes with journalism, heavily researching guests and often asking difficult questions. The hosts described their approach and reason for creating the podcast, "We believe in the power of listening, of bearing witness and sharing each other's stories."

Guests

In addition to Coates and Clinton, Another Round episodes featured many episodes with interviews of notable guests including New York Times best-selling author Roxane Gay, Hamilton writer and star Lin-Manuel Miranda, comedian Margaret Cho, writer and First Lady of New York City Chirlane McCray, and NPR's Audie Cornish. Many others have become well-known in the time after the interviews, such as writer and comedian Issa Rae and musical artist Lizzo.

Segments

In addition to interviews and Stacy's Career Corner, segments on Another Round included Drunken Debates, Tracy's Animal Corner, Is This Real Life?, What Had Happened Was, Rapid Fire ("Pew Pew Pew!"), Nichole's Nookie Nook, Tracy's Joke Time, and White Devil's Advocate. At the end of every episode, there is also the repeating segment where the hosts would "buy a round" for something or someone that they appreciate.

Production team

Buzzfeed's Tracy Clayton and Heben Nigatu hosted Another Round.  Occasional guest hosts sat in for Nigatu after she joined The Late Show with Stephen Colbert staff in July 2016. The then Buzzfeed Managing Editor for Mobile News, Stacy-Marie Ishmael, hosted Stacy's Career Corner as a recurring guest.

Another Round was one of five podcasts formerly produced by BuzzFeed's audio team. Producers included Jenna Weiss-Berman, Eleanor Kagan, Julia Furlan and Meg Cramer, collectively referred to as the Pod Squad.

Accolades

Another Round episodes were rated "Best of 2015" by iTunes, Slate, Vulture, and The Atlantic. In 2016, Forbes named Nigatu to its annual 30 Under 30 list, citing her work on "the popular and influential BuzzFeed podcast Another Round...which has monthly listener numbers in the hundreds of thousands." Writing for The Guardian, critic Sasha Frere-Jones described hosts Nigatu and Clayton as "leading American cultural critics."

Hiatus 
In late 2017, BuzzFeed announced on their social media accounts the decision to stop producing Another Round, but that Nigatu and Clayton could take ownership and production of the show after a hiatus. BuzzFeed canceled not only Another Round, but by late 2018 cancelled its two other shows Thirst Aid Kit and See Something Say Something and laid off the entire podcast production team. The other two shows both eventually resumed production under different models, unrelated to BuzzFeed. Another Round has not returned and the hiatus is indefinite.

Both hosts of Another Round went on to take other jobs, Clayton going on to host multiple podcasts and Nigatu as a staff writer for Desus & Mero. Clayton explained in an interview to Vice that they could have continued after being given the ownership of the podcasts, but both were too tired. Clayton said, "It wasn't easy to be in the position to take away this thing that you all love and that we gave birth to for a little while. But we were tired and we needed to rest and lay down because invisible illnesses like anxiety and depression are things that even HR departments don't always acknowledge." There has been significant and continued interest in its revival, with many fans being vocal about missing the show.

Controversy about the ending of the show was reignited in June 2020, when Clayton and Nigatu shared that while they have ownership over the name they did not own any of the back catalogue. This is in contrast with the other two BuzzFeed shows, Thirst Aid Kit and See Something Say Something, which both own their back catalogue. Many people involved in the creation of Another Round have also come forward in the aftermath to say that even during production and the height of its popularity, the podcast was not given much support or resources internally. BuzzFeed has since acknowledged its lack of support, with the CEO Jonah Peretti, saying that the business was "bad at selling podcasts to clients, and [...] bad at selling content focused on Black audiences. This is inexcusable and cost us dearly. We should have developed those skills."

Episodes

References

External links
 

Audio podcasts
2015 podcast debuts
Comedy and humor podcasts
Advice podcasts
Interview podcasts
Political podcasts
BuzzFeed
Megaphone (podcasting)
2017 podcast endings
American podcasts